The Japanese government-issued rupee in Burma was a Japanese invasion money issued by the Japanese Military Authority, as a replacement for local currency during the Japanese occupation of Burma in the Second World War.

The Japanese invaded Burma in January 1942. They conquered Mandalay on 21 May 1942, forcing the British to retreat into India. The Japanese held Burma until the second Allied campaign of 1944, although an official surrender did not take place until August 1945. In 1942, the Japanese issued paper sculpture currency of 1, 5, and 10 cents and Re. , Re. , Re. 1/-, Rs. 5/-, and Rs. 10/-. Like most Japanese colonial currency from this period, a letter code was used on the notes. The first or top letter “B” indicates the note was printed and issued for Burma. The second letter or letters indicate the block (or printing batch) of the note, there are single letter blocks and double letter blocks for Burma, with the latter two letter blocks being identified by a hyphen separating the letter "B" from the block letters.

In 1943, the Japanese commuted the sentence of Dr Ba Maw, an outspoken advocate for Burmese self-rule, and installed him as the head of the puppet government. From 1943 onward the Japanese issued paper sculpture currency of Re. 1/-, Rs. 5/-, and Rs. 10/- with a Rs. 100 note/- in 1944. The Japanese characters in the oblong box at the bottom of each note read “Government of Great Imperial Japan” and the contents of the seal comprise the Japanese symbol for the Minister of Finance.

When all of these notes became obsolete, punch holes were made to indicate that the note had been "cancelled" and therefore demonetised.

Prior to the Japanese invasion, Burma circulated the Indian rupee issued by the Reserve Bank of India since the nationalized paper currency was introduced by the British Administration in 1897.

Japanese government-issued rupee in Burma (1942–44)

See also

 Emergency circulating notes
 Japanese government-issued dollar in Malaya and Borneo
 Burma
 Japanese invasion money

References

Works cited

 

Rupee
Burma
Burma in World War II
Currencies of Myanmar